Carolyn Fe is a Filipina singer and actress based in Montreal. She has released three full-length albums and an EP with the Carolyn Fe Blues Collective. Fe is also the recipient of 2018 Toronto Theatre Critics' Awards for Best Supporting Actress for her work in Calpurnia.

Early life 

Fe was born in Quezon City, Philippines.

Career

Music 
In 2008, Fe and the Carolyn Fe Blues Collective (guitarist Rami Cassab, keyboardist Tim Alleyne, bassist Oisin Little, and drummer Dan Legault) launched their first EP, 100%. Their first full length album, Original Sin, was released in 2011. Following Typhoon Haiyan in 2013, Fe and the members Carolyn Fe Blues Collective held a fundraiser to support the Red Cross's humanitarian efforts. The fundraiser, held at the House of Jazz in Montreal, raised over $300,000.

In 2014, Fe released her second full length album, Bad Taboo. Bad Taboo had 13 tracks and was recorded by Fe and the Carolyn Fe Blues Collective. The album featured performances from Guy Bélanger ("Whole Lotsa Trouble" and "Life’s Just That Good") and Shun Kikuta ("Bad Taboo"). Fe released her fourth self-produced album, Sugat Ko, in August 2018 after a four year break from releasing music. "Sugat Ko" means "my wounds" in Tagalog.

Acting 
In 2018, Fe played Precy, the Filipina housekeeper, in Audrey Dwyer's Calpurnia. She was awarded the Toronto Theatre Critics' Award for Best Supporting Actress for her work in Calpurnia. At the 2019 Toronto Fringe Festival, Fe played Lola in Through the Bamboo. She played Manang Flor, the matriarch, in Jo SiMalaya Alcampo's Hilot Means Healer in 2019 at The Theatre Centre. In 2020, Fe was cast as Lola, the grandmother of the main character, in the Nickelodeon show Blue's Clues & You!.

Other 
Fe's formed the theatre company, Altera Vitae, in 2007. In 2009, Fe directed Altera Vitae’s production of Martin Sherman's Bent in partnership with GRIS-Montreal.

Filmography

Television

Film

Theatre

Discography

Awards

Notes

References

External links 

 

Living people
Date of birth missing (living people)
21st-century Filipino actresses
21st-century Filipino women singers
Musicians from Quezon City
Filipino emigrants to Canada
Year of birth missing (living people)